Tamboeria is an extinct genus of middle sized carnivorous therocephalians from the Tapinocephalus Assemblage Zone of South Africa.

See also
 List of therapsids

References

Therocephalia genera
Guadalupian synapsids of Africa
Scylacosaurids